David Crellin (born 1961) is an English actor.

Crellin, who was born in Sheffield, South Yorkshire, is known for roles in Emmerdale as Billy Hopwood, BBC 2's BAFTA award-winning series The Cops as Alan Wakefield, and Coronation Street as gangster Jimmy Clayton, chargenurse Thornton who looked after Don Brennan after his car crash, and receiver Graham Baxter who wound up MVB Motors. He also starred as Jimmy Grainger in the first series of Waterloo Road on BBC One.

Signed to British independent record label Everyday Records 2008, Crellin recorded a debut EP Innocent Bystander. In 2010 he returned to Coronation Street in another role; that of Colin Fishwick, a teacher friend of John Stape. David trained to become an actor at the Rose Bruford College of Speech & Drama.

Crellin lives with his wife and children in Horwich, near Bolton.

Filmography

Film

Television

External links

 Record Company website

Living people
English male soap opera actors
People from Horwich
Male actors from Sheffield
1961 births